Ipanephis is a monotypic moth genus of the family Noctuidae described by Nye in 1975. Its only species, Ipanephis esperanzalis, was first described by Schaus in 1913. It is found in Costa Rica.

References

Herminiinae
Monotypic moth genera